Scatha may refer to:

 Scatha the Worm, a fictional dragon from J. R. R. Tolkien's Middle-earth legendarium
 Scáthach, a Celtic warrior goddess from Scotland
 SCATHA (Spacecraft Charging At High Altitudes), a United States Air Force satellite designed to collect data on the electrical charging of spacecraft